Douglas Stenstrom (September 5, 1921 – June 23, 2010) was an American politician and lawyer.

Born in Sanford, Florida, Stenstrom graduated from University of Florida. He then served in the United States Army with the Chemical Corps during World War II in the Pacific. After the war, Stenstrom graduated from Stetson College of Law and was admitted to the Florida bar. Stenstrom served as a Florida county court judge and then served in the Florida State Senate 1955–1960. The Douglas Stenstrom Bridge commonly known as the Osteen Bridge was named after him. An elementary school in Oviedo, Florida was named Douglas Stenstrom Elementary School.

Notes

1921 births
2010 deaths
People from Sanford, Florida
Military personnel from Florida
University of Florida alumni
Stetson University College of Law alumni
Florida state court judges
Florida state senators
20th-century American judges
United States Army personnel of World War II